The Very Hot Summer Tour was the third headlining concert tour by American country music artist Thomas Rhett. The tour was in support of his fourth studio album Center Point Road (2019). It began on April 24, 2019, in Montreal, Quebec and concluded on October 12, 2019, in Nashville, Tennessee.  Dustin Lynch, Russell Dickerson, and Rhett's father, Rhett Akins opened the shows. The tour was announced in November 2018.

Opening acts
Dustin Lynch
Russell Dickerson
Rhett Akins
Tyler Hubbard 
Little Big Town 
Hardy

Critical reception
Madeline Colman of The Charlotte Observer said, "Throughout the night, there was a consistently upbeat atmosphere." which was "electric."

Setlist
This is an average setlist for the tour.
	
"Look What God Gave Her"
"Crash and Burn"	
"Get Me Some of That"	
"Craving You"	
"Sixteen"	
"Don't Threaten Me with a Good Time"	
"It Goes Like This"	
"Remember You Young"	
"Make Me Wanna" / "Suit & Tie" 
"Life Changes"
"That Old Truck"
"Star of the Show"
"Round Here" 
"Creepin'" / "Homeboy" 
"Vacation"
"Marry Me"
"Die a Happy Man"	
"Unforgettable"
Encore
"T-Shirt"

Tour dates

References

2019 concert tours